Walling v. Helmerich & Payne, Inc, 323 U.S. 37 (1944), is a US labor law case, concerning the minimum wage.

Facts
The employer, Helmerich and Payne Inc had the practice of paying workers more in the second half of the day than the first, so that overtime on weekends was calculated to the lower rate (clocked premiums) and could not be premium pay, so as to keep wages for overtime the average.

Judgment
Justice Murphy, writing for the majority, held that clock premiums or rolled up pay cannot be treated as premium pay.

See also

United States labor law

References

External links
 

United States labor case law
United States Supreme Court cases
United States Supreme Court cases of the Stone Court
1944 in United States case law